Raisin cake is a type of cake that is prepared using raisins as a main ingredient. Additional ingredients are sometimes used, such as chocolate and rum. Raisin cake dates back to at least the time of the reign of David, circa 1010–970 BCE. Boiled raisin cake is prepared by boiling various ingredients and then baking the mix in an oven. It dates back to at least the time of the American Civil War (1861–1865).

Overview

Raisin cake is typically prepared using standard cake ingredients and raisins as a primary ingredient. Whole or chopped raisins can be used. Additional various ingredients are also sometimes used, such as rum, chocolate, and others. The use of rum can serve to plump-up the raisins via the added moisture, and the raisins can be marinated in rum before the cake is prepared. Spices such as cinnamon, nutmeg, cloves and pumpkin spice are sometimes used.

History
It is stated in chapter 6:19 in the second Book of Samuel that cake (identified as "raisin cake" in Hosea 3:1) was distributed by David, who reigned as the second king of the United Kingdom of Israel and Judah –970 BCE. This raisin cake consisted of "a mass of dried grapes".

Some recipes in the United States circa the early 1900s utilized lard as an ingredient, which could be used instead of butter.

Boiled raisin cake

Boiled raisin cake is a type of raisin cake whereby various ingredients are first boiled, after which the batter is placed in cake pans then baked. It is sometimes prepared with the omission of some standard cake ingredients, such as butter, eggs or milk. Boiled raisin cake may have a moist consistency. The cake dates back to the time of the American Civil War (1861–1865), when it was prepared in frontier areas using the Dutch oven. Basic versions during this time were typically prepared using only raisins, sugar and a fat, such as vegetable shortening or lard. Boiled raisin cake has been referred to as a type of war cake.

Gallery

See also

 List of cakes
 List of raisin dishes and foods
 Panettone
 Plum cake
 Raisin bread

References

Further reading

External links
 "Russian Oven: Stolichny raisin cake, a delicate taste of Soviet times". Rbth.com.

Cakes
Raisins
German cakes